Russia competed at the 2004 Summer Olympics in Athens, Greece, from 13 to 29 August 2004. This was the nation's third consecutive appearance at the Summer Olympics as an independent nation. The Russian Olympic Committee sent a total of 446 athletes to the Games, 244 men and 202 women, to compete in all sports, except baseball, field hockey, football, and softball.

Russia left Athens with a total of 90 Olympic medals – 28 golds, 26 silver, and 36 bronze – finishing second only to the United States in the overall medal standings, and third in the gold medal tally. The Russian delegation proved particularly successful in several sports, winning a total of nineteen medals in athletics, ten each in shooting and wrestling, seven in gymnastics and weightlifting, six in boxing, and five in cycling and judo. From the twenty-four sports played by the athletes, twelve of them won more than a single Olympic medal. Russian athletes dominated in rhythmic gymnastics and synchronized swimming, where they won gold medals in every event. Among Russia's team-based athletes, the indoor volleyball teams, along with men's handball and water polo and women's basketball, claimed Olympic medals in their respective tournaments.

Among the nation's medalists were synchronized swimming pair Anastasia Davydova and Anastasiya Yermakova, who both won gold in the women's duet and team routines, pole vaulter Yelena Isinbayeva, who later emerged as Russia's most promising track star in the decade, and Greco-Roman wrestler Khasan Baroev, who sought revenge for Russia on Aleksandr Karelin's defeat from Sydney to take home the super heavyweight title. Five-time Olympian Andrey Lavrov helped the men's handball team beat the Hungarians on his quest for the bronze medal and fourth medal overall in his fifth and final Olympic appearance.

As of 2021, this is Russia's best ever result in terms of overall medals and second-best result in terms of gold medals (after 2000).

Medalists

|  style="text-align:left; width:72%; vertical-align:top;"|

| style="text-align:left; width:23%; vertical-align:top;"|

Archery

Five Russian archers (two men and three women) qualified each for the men's and women's individual archery, and a spot for the women's team.

Men

Women

Athletics

Russian athletes achieved qualifying standards in the following athletics events (up to a maximum of 3 athletes in each event at the 'A' Standard, and 1 at the 'B' Standard). On 23 August 2004, shot putter Irina Korzhanenko was stripped of her gold medal and received a lifetime ban by the International Olympic Committee after she tested positive for the steroid stanozolol. On 5 December 2012, Korzhanenko's teammate Svetlana Krivelyova was ordered to hand back her bronze, as the drug re-testings of her samples were positive.

Men
Track & road events

Field events

Combined events – Decathlon

Women
Track & road events

Field events

Combined events – Heptathlon

Badminton

Basketball

Women's tournament

Roster

Group play

Quarterfinals

Semifinals

Bronze medal game

 Won bronze medal

Boxing

Russia sent eleven boxers to Athens. With three gold medals and three bronze medals, Russia was the second most successful nation at boxing in Athens, behind only Cuba.  Like Cuba, Russia sent a boxer to Athens in each of the eleven weight classes.  Only one of the Russians came away without any victories, as he faced a Cuban in the first round.  In all, four Russian boxers fell to the Cuban team while only one Russian was able to win against the Cubans. In addition to the six medallists (the three gold medallists were undefeated while the three bronze medallists lost their semifinal bouts), three more Russians made it to the quarterfinals.

Canoeing

Sprint
Men

Women

Qualification Legend: Q = Qualify to final; q = Qualify to semifinal

Cycling

Road
Men

Women

Track
Sprint

Pursuit

Time trial

Omnium

Mountain biking

Diving

Russian divers qualified for eight individual spots at the 2004 Olympic Games. Four Russian synchronized diving teams qualified through the 2004 FINA Diving World Cup.

Men

Women

Equestrian

Dressage

Show jumping

Fencing

Men

Women

Gymnastics

Artistic
Men
Team

Individual finals

Women
Team

Individual finals

Rhythmic

Trampoline

Handball

Men's tournament

Roster

Group play

Quarterfinals

Semifinals

Bronze medal match

 Won bronze medal

Judo

Eleven Russian judoka (seven men and four women) qualified for the 2004 Summer Olympics.

Men

Women

Modern pentathlon

Four Russian athletes qualified to compete in the modern pentathlon event through the European and UIPM World Championships.

Rowing

Russian rowers qualified the following boats:

Men

Women

Qualification Legend: FA=Final A (medal); FB=Final B (non-medal); FC=Final C (non-medal); FD=Final D (non-medal); FE=Final E (non-medal); FF=Final F (non-medal); SA/B=Semifinals A/B; SC/D=Semifinals C/D; SE/F=Semifinals E/F; R=Repechage

Sailing

Russian sailors qualified one boat for each of the following events.

Men

Women

Open

M = Medal race; OCS = On course side of the starting line; DSQ = Disqualified; DNF = Did not finish; DNS= Did not start; RDG = Redress given

Shooting 

Twenty-four Russian shooters (sixteen men and eight women) qualified to compete in the following events:

Men

Women

Swimming

Russian swimmers earned qualifying standards in the following events (up to a maximum of 2 swimmers in each event at the A-standard time, and 1 at the B-standard time):

Men

Women

Synchronized swimming

Nine Russian synchronized swimmers qualified a spot in the women's team.

Table tennis

Six Russian table tennis players qualified for the following events.

Men

Women

Taekwondo

Two Russian taekwondo jin qualified for the following events.

Tennis

Russia nominated four male and five female tennis players to compete in the tournament.

Men

Women

Triathlon

Three Russian triathletes qualified for the following events.

Volleyball

Men's tournament

Roster

Group play

Quarterfinals

Semifinals

Bronze medal final

 Won bronze medal

Women's tournament

Roster

Group play

Quarterfinals

Semifinals

Gold medal final

 Won silver medal

Water polo

Men's tournament

Roster

Group play

Quarterfinals

Semifinals

Bronze medal final

 Won bronze medal

Women's tournament

Roster

Group play

Quarterfinals

Classification 5th–6th

Weightlifting

Nine Russian weightlifters qualified for the following events:

Men

* Oleg Perepetchenov originally claimed the bronze medal but was disqualified after testing positive for an anabolic steroid. 

Women

Wrestling

Men's freestyle

Men's Greco-Roman

Women's freestyle

Doping disqualifications
Originally, Russia recorded an overall tally of 92 medals at these Olympic Games. On 23 August 2004, the International Olympic Committee ordered a lifetime ban for shot putter Irina Korzhanenko and stripped her of her gold medal after she tested positive for the steroid stanozolol. Eight years later, her teammate Svetlana Krivelyova was ordered to hand back her bronze, as the drug re-testings of her samples were positive.

See also
 Russia at the 2004 Summer Paralympics

References

External links
Official Report of the XXVIII Olympiad
Russian Olympic Committee 

Nations at the 2004 Summer Olympics
2004
Summer Olympics